How the plasma transport is reduced by the strength of the external magnetic field is of great concern in studying magnetic confinement of fusion plasma. The plasma diffusion may be classified by the classical diffusion of B−2 scaling, the Bohm diffusion conjectured to follow the B−1  scaling, and the Hsu diffusion of B−3/2 scaling. Here, B is the external magnetic field.

The low-frequency fluctuating electric fields can cause particles to execute the ExB drift. Due to the long range nature of Coulomb interaction, the electric field coherence time is long enough to allow virtually free streaming of particles across the field lines.  Thus, when no other decoherence mechanism exists, the transport would be the only mechanism to limit the run of its own course and to result in the Bohm diffusion of 1/B scaling in a 2D like plasma.

In a 3D plasma, the parallel decoherence (the decoherence along the field line) is significant enough to reduce the transport of ExB drifts to only the classical diffusion. There are, however, cyclotron harmonics that can cause resonance diffusion in the velocity space leading to an unbounded Larmor radius enlargement and particle diffusion. Hsu, Wu, Agarwal, and Ryu in 2013 proposed this effective diffusion mechanism by the combined effects from the ExB drift and the cyclotron resonance.

Since the cyclotron harmonic is in tune with the particle gyration, it is effectively stationary as seen by the particles, but weakened by the finite Larmor radius (FLR) effect, i. e., I1(λ)eλ~λ≡k⊥2ρ2<<1 in the thermal fluctuation spectrum, where k⊥ is the wave number perpendicular to the magnetic field and ρ≡vth/Ω is the plasma gyroradius, vth the thermal velocity and Ω the gyrofrequecy. When the parallel decoherence, characterized by 1/k||vth , and the perpendicular diffusive damping, characterized by k⊥2D, are on the same time scale, namely, Ω>>k⊥2D~k||vth>>νc, it results in a diffusion coefficient
 

The electric field energy of thermal fluctuations is a fraction of the particle thermal energy given by δE2~εpn0kBT, where εp is the plasma parameter. Therefore, the renormalized D value gives the Hsu diffusion of the 1/B3/2 scaling .

See also

 Bohm diffusion
 Classical diffusion
 Plasma diffusion

References

Diffusion
Plasma physics